Charles Crawford "Doc" Stroud (October 23, 1870 – December 8, 1949) was an American football, basketball, and baseball coach and college athletics administrator.

Stroud was born on October 26, 1870 in Thompson, Connecticut and attended Putnam High School in Putnam, Connecticut. He graduated from Tufts College in 1894. At Tufts, he played on the varsity football and baseball team and was captain of the track team. He taught for a year at Burr and Burton Academy in Manchester, Vermont before returning to Tufts in 1895 to attend Tufts Medical College and coach football. Stroud earned a Doctor of Medicine degree from Tufts in 1897 and subsequently served as the school's physical director of athletics. He resigned from his position at Tufts in 1905 to succeed J. W. H. Pollard as physical director and athletic coach at Rochester University in Rochester, New York.

In 1910, Stroud was hired as the athletic director at Mercer University in Macon, Georgia. He left Mercer in 1913 to become the athletic director at Louisiana State University (LSU). At LSU, he also served as head coach for the LSU basketball and LSU  baseball teams. He coached the men's basketball team for one season during the 1919–20 basketball season and had a 19–2 record. He coached the baseball team for eight seasons from 1914 to 1921 and compiled a record of 75–58–5. Stroud was also as the head baseball coach and athletic director at Louisiana State Normal School—now known as Northwestern State University–Natchitoches, Louisiana.

Stroud died on December 8, 1949 in Natchitoches.

Head coaching record

Football

References

External links
 

1870 births
1949 deaths
19th-century players of American football
American football ends
LSU Tigers baseball coaches
LSU Tigers basketball coaches
Mercer Bears athletic directors
Mercer Bears baseball coaches
Mercer Bears football coaches
Mercer Bears men's basketball coaches
Northwestern State Demons and Lady Demons athletic directors
Northwestern State Demons baseball coaches
Rochester Yellowjackets football coaches
Rochester Yellowjackets men's basketball coaches
Tufts Jumbos baseball players
Tufts Jumbos football coaches
Tufts Jumbos football players
College men's basketball head coaches in the United States
College men's track and field athletes in the United States
Tufts University School of Medicine alumni
People from Putnam, Connecticut
People from Thompson, Connecticut
Sportspeople from Windham County, Connecticut
Coaches of American football from Connecticut
Players of American football from Connecticut
Baseball coaches from Connecticut
Baseball players from Connecticut
Basketball coaches from Connecticut
Track and field athletes from Connecticut